The discography of English rock band The Heavy consists of five studio albums, one greatest hits album, one extended play, and 16 singles.

Albums

Studio albums

Compilation albums

Extended plays

Singles

Other charted songs

References

Discographies of British artists